Petar Andonovski (born 1987, Kumanovo) is a writer from North Macedonia. 

He studied literature in Skopje, and now works for the Polica publishing house. He is known for the following works:
 the novel Телото во кое треба да се живее (The Body One Must Live In), winner of the 2015 National Novel of the Year Award
 Ментален простор (Mental Space, poetry collection, 2008) 
 Oчи со боја на чевли (Shoe-colored Eyes, novel, 2013).

He won the 2020 EU Prize for Literature for the novel СТРАВ ОД ВАРВАРИ.

References

Macedonian writers
1987 births
Living people